East Hull may refer to:

 East Hull A.R.L.F.C., rugby league team
 East Hull F.C., association football team
 Kingston upon Hull East (UK Parliament constituency)